

South West England (81)

Cornwall (13)

Devon (17)

Somerset (13)

Dorset (10)

Gloucestershire (13)

Wiltshire (15)

South East England (104)

Buckinghamshire (8)

Oxfordshire (7)

Berkshire (8)

Hampshire (16)

Surrey (11)

Sussex (15)

Kent (21)

Middlesex (18)

East Anglia (45)

Bedfordshire (4)

Hertfordshire (4)

Huntingdonshire (3)

Cambridgeshire (5)

Norfolk (10)

Suffolk (9)

Essex (10)

East Midlands (48)

Derbyshire (8)

Nottinghamshire (10)

Lincolnshire (14)

Leicestershire (6)

Rutland (2)

Northamptonshire (8)

West Midlands (57)

Herefordshire (6)

Worcestershire (11)

Warwickshire (11)

Shropshire (10)

Staffordshire (19)

North West England (57)

Cheshire (14)

Lancashire (32)

Cumberland (8)

Westmorland (3)

Yorkshire (40)

York (2)

Yorkshire, North Riding (10)

Yorkshire, West Riding (22)

Yorkshire, East Riding (6)

North East England (23)

Northumberland (10)

Durham (13)

Wales (33)

Anglesey (2)

Caernarvonshire (2)

Denbighshire (3)

Flintshire (2)

Merionethshire (1)

Montgomeryshire (2)

Cardiganshire (2)

Pembrokeshire (3)

Carmarthenshire (3)

Radnorshire (2)

Breconshire (2)

Glamorganshire (6)

Monmouthshire (3)

Scotland (58)

Orkney and Shetland (1)

Caithness (2)

Sutherland (1)

Ross and Cromarty (1)

Invernessshire (2)

Banffshire (1)

Elginshire and Nairnshire (2)

Aberdeenshire (3)

Kincardineshire (1)

Forfarshire (4)

Perthshire (2)

Clackmannanshire and Kinrossshire (1)

Fife (3)

Argyllshire (1)

Dunbartonshire (1)

Renfrewshire (3)

Stirlingshire (3)

Ayrshire (4)

Buteshire (1)

Lanarkshire (5)

Linlithgowshire (1)

Edinburghshire (4)

Haddingtonshire (2)

Dumfriesshire (2)

Wigtownshire (2)

Kirkcudbright Stewartry (1)

Peeblesshire and Selkirkshire (1)

Roxburghshire (2)

Berwickshire (1)

Ulster (29)

Antrim (6)

Londonderry (4)

Tyrone (3)

Armagh (4)

Down (3)

Fermanagh (3)

Donegal (2)

Monaghan (2)

Cavan (2)

Connacht (14)

Galway (4)

Leitrim (2)

Roscommon (3)

Sligo (3)

Mayo (2)

Leinster (33)

Longford (2)

Louth (4)

King's County (2)

Queen's County (3)

Meath (2)

Westmeath (2)

Carlow (3)

Dublin (4)

Wicklow (2)

Kildare (2)

Kilkenny (3)

Wexford (4)

Munster (27)

Clare (3)

Tipperary (4)

Limerick (4)

Kerry (3)

Cork (8)

Waterford (5)

Universities (9)

References

See also 

1885
1860s in the United Kingdom
1870s in the United Kingdom
1880s in the United Kingdom